The Association of International Schools in Africa (AISA) is a professional association of international schools in Africa.  It was founded in 1969.

Description 
AISA's membership also includes Associate Members which are businesses, organizations and universities

The association currently serves 79 member schools located across Africa and 81 associate members.

Governance 
AISA is governed by a team of nine board members. The board members are school heads from AISA member schools who  serve for a 2-year term.

The AISA team supporting the functions of the association consists of the following roles:

 Executive Director
 Deputy Executive Director
 Child Protection and Wellbeing Programme Manager
 Finance and Administration Manager
 Events Manager
 Administrative Officer

Programs 
AISA offers learning events such as Deep Dives, Professional Learning Institutes and Webinars.

AISA scholarships and awards are available to educators, school leaders and students.

In addition to supporting professional learning needs, AISA also assists its member schools through the following programmes:

 Governance and Leadership
 School Effectiveness
 Child Protection
 Visiting Consultant/Author

External links 
AISA

References

Education in Africa
Private and independent school organizations
International school associations